The 2009 elections for elected officials in Los Angeles took place on March 3, 2009, with run-off elections on May 19, 2009. The mayor, city attorney, city controller and eight out of the fifteen members of the city council were up for election.

Results
Officially all candidates are non-partisan. *Incumbent.

Mayor

Incumbent Antonio Villaraigosa was re-elected.

City attorney

Incumbent Rocky Delgadillo could not stand for re-election due to term limits. Carmen Trutanich was elected after the run-off election on May 19, 2009.

City controller
 

Incumbent Laura N. Chick could not stand for re-election due to term limits.

City council
 

 

District 1

District 3

District 5
Incumbent Jack Weiss was running for the city attorney post.

District 7

District 9

District 11

District 13

District 15

References

External links
 Office of the City Clerk, City of Los Angeles

Los Angeles
2009
Los Angeles